Belvidere Township is a civil township of Montcalm County in the U.S. state of Michigan. As of the 2000 census, the township population was 2,438.

Communities 
The settlement saw some growth, but when the Chicago, Saginaw and Canada Railroad (which became part of the Pere Marquette Railway and then the Chesapeake and Ohio Railway) was built and a station was established nearer to the Flat River, Sumner subsequently sold his holdings and moved to Edmore. Hiram Clark and Dr. J. B. Daniels purchased  of land around the rail station, then platted "Six Lakes" on May 13, 1876. A post office was established on December 20, 1878.    The Six Lakes post office with ZIP code 48886 serves most of Belvidere Township as well as smaller portions of Cato Township to the west, Douglass Township to the south and Millbrook Township to the north in Mecosta County.
 The village of Edmore is to the east in Home Township and the Edmore ZIP code 48829 also serves portions of eastern Belvidere Township.
 The village of Lakeview is to the west in Cato Township and the Lakeview ZIP code 48850 also serves portions of northwest Belvidere Township.
 The city of Stanton is to the south and the Stanton ZIP code 48888 also serves a portion of southern Belvidere Township.

Geography

Demographics
As of the census of 2000, there were 2,438 people, 952 households, and 699 families residing in the township. The racial makeup of the township was 95.94% White, 0.37% African American, 1.97% Native American, 0.12% Asian, 0.25% from other races, and 1.35% from two or more races. Hispanic or Latino of any race were 1.35% of the population.

There were 952 households, out of which 32.1% had children under the age of 18 living with them, 58.9% were married couples living together, 8.5% had a female householder with no husband present, and 26.5% were non-families. 21.7% of all households were made up of individuals, and 9.8% had someone living alone who was 65 years of age or older. The average household size was 2.55 and the average family size was 2.93.

In the township the population was spread out, with 25.8% under the age of 18, 7.6% from 18 to 24, 25.9% from 25 to 44, 24.7% from 45 to 64, and 16.1% who were 65 years of age or older. The median age was 38 years. For every 100 females, there were 96.9 males. For every 100 females age 18 and over, there were 96.5 males.

The median income for a household in the township was $33,477, and the median income for a family was $37,717. Males had a median income of $33,750 versus $20,893 for females. The per capita income for the township was $15,920. About 7.4% of families and 10.6% of the population were below the poverty line, including 14.1% of those under age 18 and 10.2% of those age 65 or over.

References

Townships in Montcalm County, Michigan
1867 establishments in Michigan
Townships in Michigan
Populated places established in 1867